Manifesto Records was a UK based dance music record sub label of Mercury Records which focused on dance music across all genres. The label began operations in 1994 with the first release being a remix of Donna Summer's "I Feel Love" (in which they got Summer to re-record vocals as the original masters had been lost in a fire). The label had 13 Top 10 hits before being wound down in 2002 (a move partially brought about to "bottle the labels unique period because of its unprecedented success"). The label was briefly resurrected by Mercury between 2004 - 2006. The label was set up and headed by Eddie Gordon and Luke Neville who recruited Judge Jules as A&R. Jules would recruit Luke Neville. Ben Cherrill (who would later move to Positiva Records in 2001) also had an active role at the label, joining in 1998. Notable acts on the label included Todd Terry, Josh Wink, Byron Stingily, The Space Brothers, Yomanda and York. In 2000 the label set up a short lived subsidiary M-->Bargo.

Mercury Records would occasionally release promotional club remixes of some of its artists on Manifesto labelled 12"s, in particular for Dina Carroll, who released one single through the label, "Without Love" in 1999.

Releases

Singles

Albums

Promotional singles

M-->Bargo releases

References

British record labels
English electronic dance music record labels
Universal Music Group